LisaProject was the first GUI-based project management software. Developed for the Apple Lisa computer,  LisaProject was conceived and implemented by Debra Willrett of SoloSoft and developed for Apple's Lisa computer.

In 1981, Willrett realized that project management was a universal problem and that a GUI-based application would be a useful tool. She proposed what became LisaProject to Trip Hawkins at Apple. At the time, Apple was developing the Apple Lisa computer which had limited software.

LisaProject was the first project management system to simplify the project management process by allowing the user to interactively draw their project on the computer in the form of a PERT chart.  Constraints could be entered for each task, and the relationships between tasks would show which ones had to be completed before a task could begin. Given the task constraints and relationships, a "critical path", schedule and budget could be calculated dynamically using heuristic methods.  Once this was complete, the schedule data could be viewed as a Gantt chart.

Although the Lisa ultimately failed in the marketplace, its largest Lisa customer was NASA, which had used LisaProject for project management.  In response to the demand for LisaProject from NASA and other customers, a new version called MacProject was made available with the first Macintosh release in 1984.

References

Classic Mac OS-only software made by Apple Inc.
Project management software
1981 software